Garfield is an "L" station on the CTA's Green Line. It is situated at 320 E. Garfield Boulevard in the Washington Park neighborhood. It opened on October 12, 1892.

Another  station, in the median of the Dan Ryan Expressway, serves the Red Line. During the closure of the Dan Ryan branch of the Red Line from May through October 2013, Garfield station served as the terminus of several temporary bus routes in order to mitigate the effects of the closure. Each of the bus routes transferred passengers from the sites of closed Red Line stations south of 69th street to Garfield station, where fares were waived while the Red Line remained closed.

The station is close to the University of Chicago and is the closest 'L' station to the Museum of Science and Industry, although the museum is more than two miles away from the station.

One station entrance is the oldest entrance on the CTA system. The entrance closed in 2000 and was filled in with cement in 2013. The front of the entrance remains. In June 2017, the University of Chicago announced plans to renovate the interior and reopen the former station entrance as a part of their Arts Block complex.

Garfield Gateway Project
The $43 million project began on June 15, 2018 and was completed on January 10, 2019.

Bus connections
CTA
55 Garfield (Owl Service)

Image gallery

References

External links
Garfield (Englewood/Jackson Park Line) Station Page at Chicago-L.org
Garfield Boulevard entrance from Google Maps Street View
Garfield Boulevard Historic Former Entrance from Google Maps Street View

CTA Green Line stations
Railway stations in the United States opened in 1892
Chicago Landmarks